Hemidonax pictus is a species of bivalve in the family Hemidonacidae.

Recommended literature 
 Ohn M. Healy, Paula M. Mikkelsen, Rüdiger Bieler fls (2008) Sperm ultrastructure in Hemidonax pictus (Hemidonacidae, Bivalvia, Mollusca): comparison with other heterodonts, especially Cardiidae, Donacidae and Crassatelloidea. Zoological Journal of the Linnean Society 153 (2), 325–347 

Hemidonacidae
Molluscs described in 1870